Mark Joseph Bellini (born January 19, 1964) is a former American football wide receiver in the National Football League (NFL) who played for the Indianapolis Colts. He played college football for the BYU Cougars.

References

1964 births
Living people
People from San Leandro, California
Sportspeople from Alameda County, California
Players of American football from California
American football wide receivers
BYU Cougars football players
National Football League replacement players
Indianapolis Colts players